Dilution cloning or cloning by limiting dilution    describes a procedure to obtain a monoclonal cell population starting from a polyclonal mass of cells.
This is achieved by setting up a series of increasing dilutions of the parent (polyclonal) cell culture. A suspension of the parent cells is made. Appropriate dilutions are then made, depending on cell number in the starting population, as well as the viability and characteristics of the cells being cloned.
After the final dilutions are produced, aliquots of the suspension are plated  or placed in wells  and incubated. If all works correctly, a monoclonal cell colony will be produced. Applications for the procedure include cloning of parasites, T cells, transgenic cells, and macrophages.

References

External links
Robert Staszewski "Cloning by Limiting Dilution: an improved estimate that an interesting culture is monoclonal" 
John A. Ryan "Cell Cloning by Serial Dilution in 96 Well Plates".
Vilma Maldonado,Jorge Meléndez-Zajgla "A modified method for cloning adherent mammalian cells".
"Cloning by Limiting Dilution".
"Cloning by limiting dilution".
Nanci Donacki "Cloning by Limiting Dilution of Hybridoma".

Biochemical separation processes
Cell culture techniques
Cloning